Aṣṭachāp (meaning "8 seals" in Hindi) is a term used to refer to a group of 8 devout poets who were disciples of Vallabhacharya and his son Vitthalnath, who sang Haveli Sangeet prayers, praises, kirtans and musical storytelling different leelas of Lord Krishna, in Dhrupad Dhamma, Dwi Padi, TriPadi, Chatus Padi, ShatPadi, Ashta Padi Prabandh 

It was established in 1565 AD with the foundation of Pushtimarg. The poet Sūrdās was the most well known member of the group the others being, Paramānanddās, Nanddās, Kṛṣṇadās, Govindsvāmī, Kumbhandās, Chītasvāmī, and Caturbhujdās. Apart from astachap kirtaniya Surdas ji, KumbhandasJi was also a great pre-eminent music doyen.

Each member of Astachaps, are assigned the duty of a particular part of daily worship.

References

 Bhakti movement
16th-century Indian poets